Gera – Jena – Saale-Holzland-Kreis was one of the 299 single member constituencies used for the German parliament, the Bundestag. One of nine districts covering the state of Thuringia, it covered the cities of Gera and Jena and the Saale-Holzland district.

The constituency was created for the 2005 election, expanding the Gera – Saale-Holzland-Kreis constituency by adding the city of Jena from the abolished Jena – Weimar – Weimarer Land constituency. Both the predecessor constituencies, which had been created for the 2002 election, had been won by the Social Democratic Party of Germany (SPD), and they won the new constituency in the 2005 election. However at the 2009 election the constituency was one of two in Thuringia gained by The Left and in 2013 it was one of all nine in the state won by the Christian Democratic Union (CDU). The last representative was Albert Weiler. For the 2017 election, the constituency was dissolved and not replaced. The area was assigned to neighboring constituencies. Gera went to Gera – Greiz – Altenburger Land, Jena to Jena – Sömmerda – Weimarer Land I and the Saale-Holzland district to Saalfeld-Rudolstadt – Saale-Holzland-Kreis – Saale-Orla-Kreis.

Results

2013 election

References

Federal electoral districts in Thuringia
Gera
Jena
Saale-Holzland-Kreis
2005 establishments in Germany
2017 disestablishments in Germany
Constituencies established in 2005
Constituencies disestablished in 2017